The Bishop of Durham is the Anglican bishop responsible for the Diocese of Durham in the Province of York. The diocese is one of the oldest in England and its bishop is a member of the House of Lords. Paul Butler has been the Bishop of Durham since his election was confirmed at York Minster on 20 January 2014. The previous bishop was Justin Welby, now Archbishop of Canterbury. The bishop is one of two (the other is the Bishop of Bath and Wells) who escort the sovereign at the coronation.

He is officially styled The Right Reverend (Christian Name), by Divine Providence Lord Bishop of Durham, but this full title is rarely used. In signatures, the bishop's family name is replaced by Dunelm, from the Latin name for Durham (the Latinised form of Old English Dunholm). In the past, bishops of Durham varied their signatures between Dunelm and the French Duresm. Prior to 1836 the bishop had significant temporal powers over the Liberty of Durham and later the County Palatine of Durham. 

Bishops have lived in Durham Castle from its construction in the 11th century. In 1832, Auckland Castle became the official residence of the bishops of Durham until July 2012, when ownership of the castle was transferred over to the Auckland Castle Trust, a charitable foundation, with the aim of beginning a major restoration of the grounds and castle and creating permanent exhibitions on the history of Christianity in Britain and the North East. The bishop continues to have offices in Auckland Castle but no longer resides there.

History 

The Bishop of Lindisfarne is an episcopal title which takes its name after the tidal island of Lindisfarne, which lies just off the northeast coast of Northumberland, England. The title was first used by the Anglo-Saxons between the 7th and 10th centuries. In the reign of Æthelstan (924–939) Wigred, thought by Simon Keynes to have been Bishop of Chester-le-Street, attested royal charters. According to George Molyneaux, the church of St Cuthbert "was in all probability the greatest landholder between the Tees and the Tyne". Traditionally, following the chronology of the twelfth-century writer Symeon of Durham, historians have believed that the body of St Cuthbert and centre of the diocese lay at Chester-le-Street from the ninth century until 995, but recent research has suggested that the bishops may have been based at Norham on the River Tweed until after 1013.  The title of "bishop of Lindisfarne" is now used by the Roman Catholic Church for a titular see.

The Anglo-Saxon bishops of Lindisfarne were ordinaries of several early medieval episcopal sees (and dioceses) in Northumbria and pre-Conquest England. The first such see was founded at Lindisfarne in 635 by Saint Aidan.

From the 7th century onwards, in addition to his spiritual authority, the bishops of Lindisfarne, and then Durham, also acted as the civil ruler of the region as the lord of the liberty of Durham, with local authority equal to that of the king. The bishop appointed all local officials and maintained his own court. After the Norman Conquest, this power was retained by the bishop and was eventually recognised with the designation of the region as the County Palatine of Durham. As holder of this office, the bishop was both the earl of the county and bishop of the diocese. Though the term 'prince-bishop' has become a common way of describing the role of the bishop prior to 1836, the term was unknown in Medieval England.  

A UNESCO site describes the role of the prince-bishops as a "buffer state between England and Scotland":From 1075, the bishop of Durham became a prince-bishop, with the right to raise an army, mint his own coins, and levy taxes. As long as he remained loyal to the king of England, he could govern as a virtually autonomous ruler, reaping the revenue from his territory, but also remaining mindful of his role of protecting England’s northern frontier.

A 1788 report adds that the bishops had the authority to appoint judges and barons and to offer pardons.  

Except for a brief period of suppression during the English Civil War, the bishopric retained this temporal power until it was abolished by the Durham (County Palatine) Act 1836 with the powers returned to the Crown. A shadow of the former temporal power can be seen in the bishop's coat of arms, which contains a coronet as well as a mitre and crossed crozier and sword. The bishop of Durham also continued to hold a seat in the House of Lords; that has continued to this day by virtue of the ecclesiastical office.

List of bishops

Early Medieval bishops

Pre-Reformation prince-bishops

Post-Reformation prince-bishops

Late modern bishops (since 1836)

Assistant bishops
Among those who have served as assistant bishops of the diocese have been:
1889–1902 (ret.): Daniel Sandford, Rector of Boldon and coadjutor bishop; former Bishop of Tasmania
1904–1906: Noel Hodges, former Bishop of Travancore and Cochin (later Assistant Bishop of Ely and of St Albans)
1970–1975: Kenneth Skelton, Rector of Bishopwearmouth and former Bishop of Matabeleland (became Bishop of Lichfield)

References

Sources

External links
Catholic Encyclopedia

 
Durham
Bishops of Durham
 
History of Northumberland
History of Durham, England